Künsberg was a German dynasty of knights from Frankenwald and Upper Franconia.

The House of Künsberg took its name from Künsberg near Creußen. The family was directly related to the House of Sparneck. Caroline von Holnstein was married with Wilhelm Freiherr von Künsberg.

German noble families
Franconian nobility